Suleiman Okhaifoede Braimoh Jr. (born October 19, 1989) is a Nigerian-American professional basketball player for Maccabi Tel Aviv of the Israeli Basketball Premier League and the Euroleague. He played college basketball for Rice University before playing professionally in the NBA Development League, Qatar, Japan, New Zealand, Mexico, Germany, Russia, France, Israel, and Turkey.

Early life
Braimoh was born in Benin City, Nigeria, but moved to the United States with his parents in 2001. Playing primarily soccer as a child, it was not until 2004–05 that he started playing organised basketball.

High school career
Braimoh attended the United Nations International School in New York City. As a senior in 2005–06, he averaged 27 points, 11 rebounds, and four blocks as he was named athlete of the year and league MVP. In 2006–07, he prepped at Lawrenceville School in Lawrenceville, New Jersey where he averaged 14 points, 12 rebounds, and five blocks for coach Ron Kane. He was named second-team all-prep by the Trenton Times and the Trentonian and was selected to the All-Middle Atlantic Prep League team as the Big Red posted an 18–11 overall record.

College career
In his freshman season at Rice, Braimoh was the Owls sixth man and was the team's leading shooter from the field, connecting on 46.3 percent of his shots. In 30 games (seven starts), he averaged 4.0 points and 3.3 rebounds per game.

In his sophomore season, his role and production was relatively similar as he was still the team's sixth man. In 32 games (15 starts), he averaged 4.5 points and 3.0 rebounds per game.

In his junior season, he played 31 games, averaging 4.5 points and 3.8 rebounds in 12.3 minute per game. In his senior season, he played 31 games, averaging 4.4 points and 2.1 rebounds in 10.8 minutes per game.

Professional career

2011–12 season
After going undrafted in the 2011 NBA draft, Braimoh tried out for the Rio Grande Valley Vipers of the NBA Development League in November and successfully made the team. In February 2012, he left the Vipers after appearing in just 15 games. The next month, he joined Al-Gharafa of Qatar for the rest of the season.

2012–13 season
On October 6, 2012, Braimoh signed with the Taranaki Mountainairs for the 2013 New Zealand NBL season. He was later acquired by the Reno Bighorns on November 1 but did not end up making the final team as he was waived on November 21 prior to the start of the season. In January 2013, he signed with Al Rayyan of Qatar for the rest of the season, going on to help the club win the 2013 Emir Cup and Heir Apparent Cup.

In April 2013, he was released from his contract with the Mountainairs after his application for a visa was turned down.

2013–14 season
In October 2013, Braimoh signed with Niigata Albirex of Japan for the 2013–14 season. On February 5, 2014, he left Niigata and joined the Shinshu Brave Warriors for the rest of the season, but on February 21, he was released by Shinshu after appearing in just three games.

In March 2014, he re-signed with the Taranaki Mountainairs for the 2014 New Zealand NBL season. On May 1, he was named Player of the Week for Round 4. He went on to earn Player of the Week honors the following three rounds as well, making it four consecutive on the season. He finished the season with averages of 24.9 points, 12.2 rebounds and 1.5 blocks in 18 games and subsequently earned All-Star Five honors.

2014–15 season
In September 2014, Braimoh signed with Huracanes de Tampico of Mexico for the 2014–15 LNBP season. In 46 games for Huracanes, he averaged 20.1 points and 8.2 rebounds per game.

On March 25, 2015, he signed with the Hawke's Bay Hawks for the 2015 New Zealand NBL season. On May 1, he was named Player of the Week for Round 4 after recording 21 points and 14 rebounds against Taranaki on April 26. In 16 games for the Hawks, he averaged 17.8 points, 8.6 rebounds, 1.8 assists, 1.2 steals and 1.1 blocks per game.

2015–16 season
On July 16, 2015, Braimoh signed with the Gießen 46ers of Germany for the 2015–16 Basketball Bundesliga season. In 32 games for the 46ers, he averaged 12.3 points, 3.7 rebounds and 1.3 assists per game.

2016–17 season
On September 17, 2016, Braimoh signed with Enisey Krasnoyarsk of the VTB United League. Braimoh won the VTB United League Sixth Man of the Year Award for the 2016–17 season. He played in 24 games during the regular season (starting 22 on the bench), averaging 13.0 points, 5.0 rebounds, 1.8 assists and a 13.8 efficiency rating.

On May 12, 2017, Braimoh signed with French team Nanterre 92 for the rest of the 2016–17 Pro A season.

2017–18 season
On June 21, 2017, Braimoh re-signed with Enisey Krasnoyarsk for the 2017–18 season. In 23 league games, he averaged 10.9 points, 6.4 rebounds, 1.2 assists and 1.1 steals per game. He also averaged 9.8 points, 6.5 rebounds and 1.0 blocks in 14 BCL games.

2018–19 season
On November 4, 2018, Braimoh signed a one-year deal with the Israeli team Hapoel Eilat as a replacement for Devin Thomas. On February 28, 2019, Braimoh recorded a season-high 28 points, shooting 11-of-15 from the field, along with four rebounds and two steals in a 93–75 win over Ironi Nahariya. On April 4, 2019, Braimoh was named Israeli League Player of the Month after averaging 19.0 points and 5.5 rebounds for 27.3 PIR per game in four games played in March.

Braimoh helped Eilat reach the 2019 Israeli League Final Four, where they eventually lost to Maccabi Tel Aviv. In 34 games played for Eilat, he finished as the league fourth-leading player in efficiency rating (19.3 per game), to go with 15.3 points, 6.1 rebounds, 1.3 steals and 1.2 blocks per game. On June 7, 2019, Braimoh was named the Israeli League Sixth Man of the Year and earned a spot in the All-Israeli League Second Team.

2019–20 season
On July 11, 2019, Braimoh signed a 1+1 contract with Hapoel Jerusalem. On September 28, 2019, Braimoh won the Israeli League Cup title with Jerusalem after an 84–83 dramatic win over Maccabi Tel Aviv, where he recorded 16 points and 5 rebounds. He was subsequently named the Tournament MVP. On December 28, 2019, Braimoh recorded a double-double with a season-high 25 points and 10 rebounds, while shooting 9-of-16 from the field, along with three steals in a 91–84 win over Hapoel Holon. He averaged 12.2 points and 5.2 rebounds per game.

2020–21 season
On August 9, 2020, Braimoh re-signed with Hapoel Jerusalem. He averaged 17.1 points and 5.9 rebounds during the 2020–21 season.

2021–22 season
On July 21, 2021, Braimoh signed with San Pablo Burgos of the Spanish Liga ACB, with whom he played 10 games. In November 2021, he left Burgos and returned to Hapoel Jerusalem in Israel.

2022–23 season
On July 8, 2022, Braimoh signed with Tofaş of the Turkish BSL. In 12 games, he averaged 8.6 points, 6.2 rebounds, and 1.7 assists per game.

On January 19, 2023, Braimoh left Turkey and joined Maccabi Tel Aviv in Israel for the rest of the season.

Personal
Braimoh is the son of Suleiman Sr., a PhD holder, and Igho, a law school graduate.

References

External links
Suleiman Braimoh at riceowls.com
Suleiman Braimoh at nbadleague.com
Suleiman Braimoh at realgm.com
An Interview With Taranaki Standout Suleiman Braimoh

1989 births
Living people
Al-Gharafa SC basketball players
American expatriate basketball people in Germany
American expatriate basketball people in France
American expatriate basketball people in Israel
American expatriate basketball people in Japan
American expatriate basketball people in Mexico
American expatriate basketball people in New Zealand
American expatriate basketball people in Qatar
American expatriate basketball people in Russia
American expatriate basketball people in Turkey
American men's basketball players
BC Enisey players
CB Miraflores players
Centers (basketball)
Giessen 46ers players
Hapoel Eilat basketball players
Hapoel Jerusalem B.C. players
Hawke's Bay Hawks players
Huracanes de Tampico players
Lawrenceville School alumni
Nanterre 92 players
Niigata Albirex BB players
Nigerian expatriate basketball people in Israel
Power forwards (basketball)
Rice Owls men's basketball players
Rio Grande Valley Vipers players
Shinshu Brave Warriors players
Taranaki Mountainairs players
Tofaş S.K. players
United Nations International School alumni
Sportspeople from Benin City